The Amur leopard (Panthera pardus orientalis) is a leopard subspecies native to the Primorye region of southeastern Russia and northern China. It is listed as Critically Endangered on the IUCN Red List, as in 2007, only 19–26 wild leopards were estimated to survive in southeastern Russia and northeastern China. It is considered one of the rarest cats on Earth.

, fewer than 60 individuals were estimated to survive in Russia and China. Camera-trapping surveys conducted between 2014 and 2015 revealed 92 individuals in an  large transboundary area along the Russian-Chinese border.
In 2019, it was reported that the population was about 90 leopards. In 2021, it was reported the population was about 110 individuals.

Results of genetic research indicate that the Amur leopard is genetically close to leopards in northern China and Korea, suggesting that the leopard population in this region became fragmented in the early 20th century. The North Chinese leopard was formerly recognised as a distinct subspecies (P. p. japonensis), but was subsumed under the Amur leopard in 2017.

Naming and etymology 
The names 'Amurland leopard' and 'Amur leopard' were coined by Pocock in 1930, when he compared leopard specimens in the collection of the Natural History Museum, London. In particular, he referred to a leopard skin from the Amur Bay as 'Amur leopard'. Since at least 1985, this name has been used for the leopard subspecies in eastern Siberia and for the captive population in zoos worldwide.

The Amur leopard is also known as the "Siberian leopard", "Far Eastern leopard", and "Korean leopard".

Taxonomic history 
In 1857, Hermann Schlegel described a leopard skin from Korea under the scientific name Felis orientalis.
Since Schlegel's description, several naturalists and curators of natural history museums described zoological specimens of leopards from the Russian Far East and China:
Leopardus japonensis described and proposed in 1862 by John Edward Gray was a tanned leopard skin received by the British Museum.
Leopardus chinensis proposed by Gray in 1867 was a leopard skull from the mountains northwest of Peking.
Felis fontanierii proposed by Alphonse Milne-Edwards in 1867 was a leopard skin from the vicinity of Peking.
Felis ingrami was a leopard skin from Kweichow in central China, and  Felis villosa a leopard skin from the Amur Bay, both proposed by J. Lewis Bonhote in 1903.
Felis [Leopardus] grayi proposed in 1904 by Édouard Louis Trouessart was a leopard fossil.
Panthera hanensis proposed in 1908 by Paul Matschie was a leopard skin from Shaanxi province.
Felis pardus sinensis proposed in 1911 by a German fur trader was a leopard skin from southern China.
Panthera pardus bedfordi proposed in 1930 by Reginald Innes Pocock was a leopard skin from Shaanxi.
In 2017, the Cat Classification Task Force of the Cat Specialist Group subsumed P. p. japonensis to P. p. orientalis. The remaining synonyms are not considered valid subspecies.

Genetic research 
Phylogenetic analysis of leopard samples from Primorsky Krai and North Korea revealed that they cannot be distinguished. It is considered very probable that the Amur leopard metapopulation became fragmented less than a century ago.
Phylogenetic analysis of an old leopard skin from South Korea revealed it to be an Amur leopard.

The complete mitochondrial genome of a wild male leopard specimen from Shaanxi province in central China has been amplified and is 16,966 base pairs long.

Characteristics 

The Amur leopard can easily be differentiated from other leopard subspecies by its thick, pale cream-colored fur, particularly in winter. Its fur is fairly soft with long and dense hair. The winter coat varies from fairly light yellow to dense yellowish-red with a golden tinge, or rusty-reddish-yellow. In summer, the fur is brighter, with more vivid coloration pattern. It is rather small in body size, with males larger than females. Females weigh .

The North Chinese leopard was first described on the basis of a single tanned skin which was fulvous above, and pale beneath, with large, roundish, oblong black spots on the back and limbs, and small black spots on the head. The spots on the back, shoulders and sides formed a ring around a central fulvous spot. The black spots on the nape were elongated, and large ones on the chest formed a necklace. The tail was spotted and had four black rings at the tip.

Distribution and habitat 

It is well adapted to the cold climate and heavy snowfall of the region. The association of the leopard with mountainous areas (and snow-free south-facing rocky slopes in winter) has been recorded. It is usually confined to places where wild sika deer (Cervus nippon) live, or where deer husbandry is practised.
Leopards cross between Russia, China, and possibly North Korea across the Tumen River, despite a high and long wire fence marking the boundary.

The first camera trap image of an Amur leopard in northeastern China was taken in 2010 in Hunchun National Nature Reserve, in the Changbai Mountains of Jilin and Heilongjiang Provinces.

Elsewhere in China, Amur leopard distribution is fragmented, with small populations occurring foremost in isolated reserves. In Shanxi Province, leopards were recorded in 16 protected areas and six nature reserves (including Foping National Nature Reserve) during camera trapping surveys between 2007 and 2014.

Historical range 
Leopard fossils from the Pleistocene have been excavated in Japan, but the fossils' subspecies have not been identified with certainty.

Historic records from before 1930 indicate that the Amur leopard occurred throughout eastern Siberia, northeastern China (near Beijing and the mountains to its northwest, as well as Manchuria), and the Korean Peninsula. In Russia, its range was dramatically reduced during the 1970s to about 20% of its former range.

Leopards were extirpated from the Korean Peninsula while under Japanese rule. At least 624 leopards were killed during the Japanese occupation between 1910 and 1945. In South Korea, the last known leopard was captured in 1970. The Amur leopard is considered locally extinct in South Korea, and most likely so in North Korea.

In China, Amur leopards occurred in the Lesser Khingan, Changbai Mountains and Wanda Mountains until the 1970s. In the following decades, the range decreased to a few areas in Jilin and Heilongjiang Provinces. Today, only small and isolated populations remain in China.

Ecology and behavior 

Like other leopard subspecies, Amur leopards are solitary, unless females have offspring. Records from camera-traps indicate that they are more diurnal (active during the day) than nocturnal, as well as crepuscular (active during dawn and dusk) during both the summer and winter seasons. This activity pattern coincides with activity periods of prey species such as Siberian roe deer (Capreolus pygargus), Manchurian sika deer (Cervus nippon mantchuricus) and Ussuri wild boar (Sus scrofa ussuricus).

Amur leopards are extremely conservative in their choice of territory. An individual's territory is usually located in a river basin which generally extends to the natural topographical borders of the area. The territory of two individuals overlaps sometimes, but only slightly. Individuals use the same hunting trails, migration routes and even rest places over the course of many years.
Leopards are resident at places where wild animals are abundant, and follow herds of ungulates. In the Ussuri region, their main prey are Siberian roe deer, Manchurian sika deer, Manchurian wapiti (Cervus canadensis xanthopygus), Siberian musk deer (Moschus moschiferus), Amur elk (Alces alces cameloides) and Ussuri wild boar. They also catch hares (Lepus sp.), Asian badgers (Meles leucurus), fowl, and mice. In Kedrovaya Pad Nature Reserve, roe deer is their main prey year-round, but they also prey on young Asian black bear (Ursus thibetanus) cubs under two years old.

During a study of radio-collared Amur leopards in the early 1990s, a territorial dispute between two males at a deer farm was documented, suggesting that Amur leopards favour such farms for hunting. Female leopards with cubs are often found in the proximity of deer farms. The large number of domesticated deer on the farms is a reliable food source in difficult times.

Reproduction 

Amur leopards become sexually mature at the age of 2–3 years. They are able to reproduce up to 10–15 years of age. Estrus lasts 12–18 days, and in exceptional cases up to 25 days. Gestation lasts 90–105 days, and usually between 92 and 95 days. A newborn cub weighs . The young open their eyes on the 7th–10th day and begin to crawl on the 12th–15th day. By the second month they emerge from their dens and also begin to eat meat. Cubs are weaned when three months old, and then learn to hunt. Lactation continues for five or six months. Cubs reach independence at the approximate age of two to three years. They stay with their mother until they are around 18 months to two years old. Juveniles sometimes stay with their mother until she comes into estrus again. Until the 1970s, cubs were seen in Kedrovaya Pad Nature Reserve and in northeastern China most often between the end of March and May. Litters comprised two to three cubs. In captivity some individuals have lived for 21 years. In 2011, an adult Amur leopard female was radio-collared in the vicinity of the Land of the Leopard National Park in the Khasansky District of Primorskyi Krai. From autumn onwards, she gradually increased her home range.

During a population census in 1997, four females found with young had only one cub each. Results of radio telemetry studies confirmed that young stay with their mother for two years. In Kedrovaya Pad Nature Reserve, the young of two different litters were observed with their mothers at the same time.

Threats 
The Amur leopard is threatened by poaching of both individuals and prey species, habitat loss and deforestation. Its natural habitat is threatened by forest fires and construction of new roads.
Due to the small number of reproducing Amur leopards in the wild, the gene pool has such low genetic diversity that the population is at risk from inbreeding depression.
In 2015, a wild Amur leopard was found with canine distemper virus in Primorskyi Krai. Due to the small population, all wild individuals could possibly be exposed to domestic or wild disease carriers and transmitters in the future.

Amur leopards are sympatric with Siberian tigers (Panthera tigris tigris) in some areas; in the Changbai Mountains, leopards have been recorded at higher altitudes and further distances from settlements and roads than tigers. Tigers can kill leopards if densities of large and medium-sized prey species are low. Competition between these predators supposedly decreases in summer, when small prey species are more available. In winter, conditions are less favorable for tigers, which most likely causes the trophic niche overlap with leopards to peak.

Amur leopards are also sympatric with Ussuri brown bears (Ursus arctos lasiotus), but no interactions between the two species have been recorded.

Poaching 
Poaching of Amur leopards is the main threat to their survival. Despite evidence of Chinese traders illegally buying leopard skins from Russia, no skins were confiscated at borders to China until 2002 and 2003, where over seven skins or part of skins were confiscated (six in Russia and one in China) over a period of 14 months. Leopards are most often killed by local Russians from small villages in and around the leopard's habitat. These villagers hunt entirely illegally; they have no licenses for hunting or their guns, are not members of one of the local hunting leases, and hunt Amur leopards (a protected species under Russian law).

In 1999, skins of poached leopards were offered for $500–1,000 near a protected area in Russia.

Forest degradation 
Human-induced fires are another main threat to the survival of the Amur leopard. Setting fire to fields is a habit of rural farmers who start them for a particular purpose, such as improving fertility for livestock grazing, killing ticks and other insects, making scrap metals visible so that they can be easily collected, culling vegetation along train tracks, and stimulating fern growth. Young ferns are sold in shops, served in restaurants and also exported to China as a popular dish. Surveys using satellite images and GIS techniques revealed that on average, 19% of south-west Primorye burns annually, and a total of 46% burned at least once in six years. Due to a long and frequent fire history, much of the land in south-west Primorye has been converted from coniferous forests (suitable leopard habitat) to open "savannah" landscapes with grass, oak bushes and isolated trees that leopards seem to avoid (most likely due to low ungulate densities).

In the 20th century, large deer farms were built over thousands of hectares of leopard habitat; the velvet of deer antlers was sold to Asian pharmacies. However, the number of deer farms has decreased considerably since the late 1990s.

Development projects 
A number of plans for economic activities in south-west Primorye were developed that posed a serious threat to the Amur leopard's survival. A plan to build an oil pipeline from central Siberia through Primorye to the coast of the Sea of Japan was shelved; another plan for an open pit coal mine in the heart of the Amur leopard's range was not carried out following pressure from environmentalists and the Ministry of Natural Resources. The strategic location of south-west Primorye (being close to the main population centres of Primorsky Krai, the Sea of Japan and the borders with North Korea and China) makes it more attractive for economic activities, including transport, industries, tourism and development of infrastructure. The activity of logging itself is not a major threat; however, the use of road networks established for the transport of logs from forests increases anthropogenic pressures in unprotected leopard habitat.

Inbreeding 
An acute problem is potential inbreeding. The remaining population could disappear as a result of genetic degeneration, even without direct human influence. The levels of diversity are remarkably low, indicative of a history of inbreeding in the population for several generations, or a population bottleneck. Such levels of genetic reduction have been associated with severe reproductive and congenital abnormalities that impede the health, survival and reproduction of some (but not all) genetically diminished small populations. Cub survival has declined over time, from 1.9 cubs per one female in 1973 to 1.7 in 1984, and 1.0 in 1991. Besides a decline in natural replacement, there is a high probability of mortality for all age groups, as a result of certain diseases or direct human impact.

Conservation 
The Amur leopard is listed in CITES Appendix I. It is stated to need better protection from illegal trade in skins and bones.

In 2001, a meeting was held in Vladivostok with the aim of devising and planning management recommendations and activities needed to ensure the recovery and continued survival of the wild Amur leopard population in range countries. Chinese participants announced the creation of a new protected area in Jilin Province, the Hunchun Nature Reserve.
Since 2014, Russian and Chinese biologists collaborate in transboundary monitoring of the Amur leopard population.

 The Amur Leopard and Tiger Alliance (ALTA) is an initiative of Russian and western conservation organisations to conserve the Amur leopard and tiger, and secure a future for both species in the Russian Far East and Northeast China. ALTA operates across Northeast Asia under the guiding principle that only cooperative, coordinated conservation actions from all interested parties can save these endangered subspecies/populations from extinction. ALTA works in close co-operation with local, regional, and federal government and non-government organisations to protect the region's biological wealth through conservation, sustainable development, and local community involvement. The Phoenix Fund and the Wildlife Conservation Society provide a local framework for implementing ALTA projects, working closely with many Russian and Chinese agencies. With regard to conservation of leopards, ALTA aims at retaining a leopard population of 35 adult females (100 total) in south-west Primorye and the Jilin-Heilongjiang border region; and creating a second population of 20 adult females (60 adults total) in the former range of the leopard. Conservation projects for the leopard include:
four antipoaching teams with a total of 15 members in the leopard's range
a special task force of local police and anti-poaching teams led by the Khasan prosecutor
monitoring of the leopard population through snow track counts and camera trap counts
monitoring and analysis of the impact of fires on leopard habitat and the effectiveness of firefighting
habitat assessment with geographic information system (GIS) techniques: assessment of the role of habitat quality, land ownership, land use, protection status, settlements, deer farms, roads, and human settlements with use of monitoring data and satellite images
development of land-use plans that take in account future needs of leopards
support for protected areas in the leopard range
compensation of livestock kills by leopards and tigers
a comprehensive education program for school children and students in the leopard range
support for hunting leases, and an ungulate recovery program
media campaign to create awareness about the leopard's plight
support and technical assistance for the new Hunchun Nature Reserve in China that borders on the leopard range in Russia

An oil pipeline planned to be built through leopard habitat was rerouted, following a campaign by conservationists.

Reintroduction into the wild 
Since 1996, the idea of reintroducing leopards to the south of the Sikhote-Alin mountain range has been discussed by ALTA members. During a workshop in 2001, the outlines and principles of a plan for the development of a second population of the Amur leopard in the Russian Far East was prepared. For reintroduction to be successful, the reasons for leopards disappearing from the southern Sikhote-Alin in the middle of the 20th century needed to be studied. It was recommended to assess reasons for localized extinctions, obtain support of local people, increase prey in areas proposed for reintroduction, ensure that conditions exist conducive for reintroduction in the selected area, and ensure survival of the existing population. There are two sources of leopards for reintroduction: leopards born and raised in zoos and leopards raised in a special reintroduction center passed through a rehabilitation program for life in the wild.

For successful reintroduction, it is clear that the design of the breeding and release centre (and the leopard management within it) must focus strongly on overcoming the difficulties imposed by the captive origin of the cats. Two necessary behaviours should be acquired prior to release: the hunting and killing of live natural prey, and avoidance of humans and tigers.

During a meeting with Vladimir Putin in March 2009, the Minister of Natural Resources of Russia reassured that the ministry is planning to reintroduce leopards into the area, as well as create suitable and safe habita; he also stated the government had already allocated all required funds for the project.

Potential reintroduction sites (contiguous patches of preferred habitat) were identified in the southern Sikhote-Alin. Three coastal potential habitat patches could harbour a population of approximately 72 adult leopards (exceeding the 50 individual minimum needed for a self-sustaining population).

In captivity 

A captive breeding programme for the Amur leopard was established in 1961 from nine wild-born founders. A molecular genetic survey revealed that at least two founders of the captive pedigree had genetic information that is not consistent with any Amur leopards born in the wild.
Both the American and European zoo populations include contribution of genes from a male founder that was a different leopard subspecies. It has been the strategy of the European Endangered Species Programme to minimize his contribution and maintain genetic diversity of the captive population.

, 173 captive Amur leopards were held in zoos worldwide. Within the EESP, 54 male, 40 female and 7 unsexed individuals are kept. In American and Canadian zoos, another 31 males and 41 females are kept within the Population Management Program.

In media 
The Animal Planet documentary The Last Leopard (2008) is about the plight of Amur leopards in Russia. The television series "Wild Russia" showed a glimpse into the life of leopards. A female leopard and her cub were featured on Planet Earth episodes "Seasonal Forests".

See also 

Leopard subspecies
Chinese leopard
Zanzibar leopard

References

External links 

 IUCN/SSC Cat Specialist Group: Panthera pardus in Asia and short portrait P. pardus orientalis
 ALTA Amur Leopard Conservation
 The Tigris Foundation: dedicated to the conservation of the Amur leopard
 Tallinn Zoo live cameras
 ALTA: videos
 WWF Russia: Far Eastern (Amur) leopard
 WWF: Amur leopard species profile, conservation efforts and how you can help 
 AMUR Russia/UK
 WCS Russia: Far Eastern Leopard Ecology
 BBC: The Secret Leopards
 BBC: Nature's Miracle Babies. Episode 2
 WWF-US: Amur Leopard
 

Leopards
Mammals of East Asia
Critically endangered fauna of Asia
Mammals described in 1857